William Anthony Ward Power (21 July 1917 – 27 November 2002) was an Australian rules footballer who played with Footscray in the Victorian Football League (VFL).

Power's football career was interrupted by his service in the Royal Australian Air Force during World War II.

Notes

External links 

		
Billy Power's playing statistics from The VFA Project

1917 births
2002 deaths
Australian rules footballers from Melbourne
Western Bulldogs players
Oakleigh Football Club players
People from Armadale, Victoria
Royal Australian Air Force personnel of World War II
Military personnel from Melbourne